Curtiss House may refer to:

Reuben Curtiss House, Southbury, Connecticut, listed on the National Register of Historic Places (NRHP) in New Haven County, Connecticut
Glenn Curtiss House, Miami Springs, Florida, listed on the NRHP
Lua Curtiss House I, Miami Springs, Florida, listed on the NRHP
Lua Curtiss House II, Miami Springs, Florida, listed on the NRHP
Charles G. Curtiss Sr. House, Plymouth, Michigan, listed on the NRHP

See also
Curtis House (disambiguation)
Louis Curtiss Studio Building, Kansas City, Missouri, listed on the NRHP in Jackson County
Harlow C. Curtiss Building, Buffalo, New York, listed on the NRHP
Marcus Curtiss Inn, Galena, Ohio, listed on the NRHP in Delaware County
Curtiss-Wright Hangar (disambiguation)